Zero Population Growth: Bliss Out Volume 15 is a 1999 album by Lilys. Part of the Darla Records Bliss Out series, it represents a departure by Lilys leader Kurt Heasley into what has been called "krautrock-ish electronica". The album was recorded in collaboration with producer Trevor Kampmann of hollAnd, and was released in May 1999 in the UK and July 1999 in the US.

Critical reception
Allmusic writer Nitsuh Abebe only gave the album 1.5 stars out of 5, describing it as "six tracks of burbling, pop-oriented electronics". Pitchfork Media's Chip Chanko, however, rated the album at 8.9 out of 10, stating that the album is "like syrup being poured from one of those fish- shaped pitchers. It's like diving into a swimming pool filled with new crispy M&M's."

Track listing
"The Escape" – 8:05
"The Law" – 4:51
"Windows" – 4:02
"You Win" – 4:26
"Sharper Laws" – 5:17
"Back Again" – 6:08

Personnel
Kurt Heasley
Archie Moore
Trevor Kampmann

References

1999 albums
Lilys albums